The Bronze Gate, or "the Southern Gate", is the smaller of the four principal Roman gates into the stari grad (old town) of Split. Built as part of Diocletian's Palace, it was originally a sea gate from which the Emperor entered the complex by boat. Today it is the main entry point from the promenade to the cathedral.

History
Inhabitants of the palace accessed the gate through a complex of basement rooms, constructed just below the peristyle. There was no promenade; instead, the sea lapped up against the walls, allowing ships to dock at the palace. Known in late antiquity as the Porta Meridionalis ("Southern Gate"), it was probably used by Diocletian to travel to and from the docks. During the Middle Ages the gate offered a direct exit to the sea and escape in the event of an attack on the palace, and consequently became known as the "Security Gate". Today it is the most frequently used palace gate, and a starting point for many guided tours because of its access to the Riva.

Description
The Bronze Gate was the main gate of Diocletian's palace (via the sea), located in the middle of the south wall; today this section of the outer walls is the best preserved.

The gate is built in a style described by one modern guidebook as "anonymous and functional", and differs completely from the other three gates of the palace. It is smaller in size, lacks decoration, and is not supported by gatehouses on either side.

See also

 Diocletian's Palace
 Vestibule, Split
The Golden Gate (Diocletian's Palace)
The Iron Gate (Diocletian's Palace)
The Silver Gate (Diocletian's Palace) 
The Golden Gate (Constantinople), imperial entrance gate of the city of Constantinople, present-day Istanbul, Turkey
Dalmatia
Roman architecture

References

Further reading
 Šušnjar, Bogdan, Villa de Diocleziano in Split, Naklada Bošković, Split, 2003.

External links

World Heritage Sites in Croatia
Archaeological sites in Croatia
Buildings and structures in Split, Croatia
Ancient Roman buildings and structures in Croatia
Romanesque architecture
Churches in Croatia
Tourist attractions in Split-Dalmatia County
City gates in Croatia